Léon Mart (18 September 1914 – 14 July 1984) was a Luxembourgish footballer.

Career
Mart played his entire career in Luxembourg, for CS Fola Esch. He played as centre forward for Luxembourg's national team, and scored a national record 16 goals in 24 international appearances (including non-official games) between 1933 and 1946. He played in one FIFA World Cup qualification match and in one Olympic Games match.

External links
Profile – Association Luxembourgeois des Olympiens

Léon Mart's profile at Sports Reference.com

References

1914 births
1984 deaths
Luxembourgian footballers
Olympic footballers of Luxembourg
Footballers at the 1936 Summer Olympics
CS Fola Esch players
Luxembourg international footballers
Association football forwards